Josanne Lucille Lucas (born 14 May 1984) is a track and field athlete from Trinidad and Tobago who specialises in the 400 metres hurdles.

Born in Carnbee, Trinidad and Tobago, Lucas' first success was a win at the national championships in the 400 metres in 2005, but she focused on hurdling instead. She competed at the 2005 World Championships in Athletics in the 400 m hurdles but failed to progress beyond the heats. Lucas represented Trinidad and Tobago at the 2008 Summer Olympics but again did not pass the heats.

She set a new national record of 55.24 seconds in Belém at the Grande Prêmio Brasil Caixa meet in May 2009.

She won the bronze in the 400m hurdles at the World Championships for Athletics in Berlin, Germany in 2009.

She studied at Auburn University under coach Henry Rolle with Biomedical Sciences as her major. She became a teacher at Fort Collins High School, and on August 24, 2019, she became a naturalized citizen of the United States.

Personal bests

All information taken from IAAF profile.

Achievements

References

External links
 
 

1984 births
Living people
Athletes (track and field) at the 2008 Summer Olympics
Olympic athletes of Trinidad and Tobago
World Athletics Championships medalists
Commonwealth Games competitors for Trinidad and Tobago
Athletes (track and field) at the 2014 Commonwealth Games
Pan American Games competitors for Trinidad and Tobago
Athletes (track and field) at the 2015 Pan American Games
Trinidad and Tobago female hurdlers
Trinidad and Tobago female sprinters
Central American and Caribbean Games silver medalists for Trinidad and Tobago
Competitors at the 2006 Central American and Caribbean Games
Competitors at the 2014 Central American and Caribbean Games
Trinidad and Tobago expatriates in the United States
Auburn University alumni
Schoolteachers from Colorado
American women educators
Central American and Caribbean Games medalists in athletics
Naturalized citizens of the United States
21st-century American women